Year 389 (CCCLXXXIX) was a common year starting on Monday (link will display the full calendar) of the Julian calendar. At the time, it was known as the Year of the Consulship of Timasius and Promotus (or, less frequently, year 1142 Ab urbe condita). The denomination 389 for this year has been used since the early medieval period, when the Anno Domini calendar era became the prevalent method in Europe for naming years.

Events 
 By place 

 Roman Empire 
 All pagan buildings in Alexandria, including the library, are destroyed by fire.

Births 
 Geiseric, king of the Vandals and Alans (approximate date)

Deaths 
 Donatian of Reims (or Donat), Christian bishop and saint
 Florus of Lodève, Christian bishop and martyr (approximate date)
 Mao, Chinese empress and wife of Fu Deng (Former Qin)

References